Doo Hoi Kem (born 27 November 1996) is a Hong Kong table tennis player. She won two medals at the 2014 Summer Youth Olympics and she was a member of Hong Kong women's team at the 2014 World Team Championships. In 2015, she won a bronze medal in mixed doubles event with Wong Chun Ting at the World Championships. In 2021, she also won bronze in the women's team event with Lee Ho Ching and Minnie Soo Wai Yam at the 2020 Summer Olympics.

Early years
Doo studied at Tseung Kwan O Catholic Primary School and Heep Yunn School in her early years. After completing Secondary Three at the age of 15, she chose to become a full-time athlete and entered the Hong Kong Institute of Sports for training. The coaches are the former Chinese table tennis team and the Hong Kong table tennis team. She was the winner of the 2021 President’s Certificate of Appreciation (Sports).

Career

2016 
At the 2016 Summer Olympics, Doo competed in the team event along with Lee Ho Ching and Tie Ya Na. They lost to Germany in the quarterfinals.

2021 
In the 2020 Summer Olympics, Doo reached the quarter-finals in the women's single event where she lost to top seed Chen Meng after leading 2–0. In one of the more interesting wrinkles of the tournament, play was stopped mid-game in Doo's match against Chen so that Doo could cover a logo on her pants with duct tape (due to Olympic sponsorship rules). Doo, along with her teammates Lee Ho Ching and Minnie Soo Wai Yam, won bronze in the women's team event, defeating Germany with 3–1 in the bronze medal match.

Achievements

Hong Kong Sports Stars Awards 
Doo won one of the Hong Kong Junior Sports Stars Awards in 2014. As a member of the Hong Kong National Table Tennis Team (mixed doubles), she was also a two-time winner of the Hong Kong Sports Star Awards for Team Event, both in 2015 and 2017.

References

External links 
 Doo Hoi Kem at Olympedia

Hong Kong female table tennis players
Living people
1996 births
Table tennis players at the 2014 Asian Games
Table tennis players at the 2018 Asian Games
Asian Games medalists in table tennis
Asian Games bronze medalists for Hong Kong
Medalists at the 2018 Asian Games
Table tennis players at the 2014 Summer Youth Olympics
Table tennis players at the 2016 Summer Olympics
Table tennis players at the 2020 Summer Olympics
Olympic medalists in table tennis
Medalists at the 2020 Summer Olympics
Olympic bronze medalists for Hong Kong
Olympic table tennis players of Hong Kong
World Table Tennis Championships medalists
Kinoshita Abyell Kanagawa players
Hong Kong expatriate sportspeople in Japan
Expatriate table tennis people in Japan